Maroochy River is a rural hinterland locality in the Sunshine Coast Region, Queensland, Australia. In the  Maroochy River had a population of 1,531 people.

Geography
The Maroochy River meanders from west to east through the locality. The surrounding river flats are cleared and primarily used for farming. The hillsides in the north-west and south-east of the locality are primarily used for residential purposes and retain natural bushland. Coolum Creek forms the eastern boundary of the locality.

History
The name Maroochy is either a Yugarabul name collected by Andrew Petrie when he explored Wide Bay in 1842 or from Kabi word muru-kutchi meaning red bill referring to the black swan.

Maroochy River State School opened on 27 June 1911. It closed on 31 December 1972. The school was at 4 Lake Dunethin Road. The site is now occupied by the Dunethin Rock Scout campground.

In the  Maroochy River had a population of 1,337 people.

In the  Maroochy River had a population of 1,531 people.

Heritage listings

Maroochy River has a number of heritage-listed sites, including:
 Dunethin Rock Road: Dunethin Rock
 Store Road: Tramway Lift Bridge over Maroochy River

Amenities
There are a number of parks in the area, including:

 2nd/14th Battalion Park
 Callicoma Place Natural Amenity Reserve
 Coolum Creek Environmental Reserve
 Coolum Creek North Conservation Area
 Dunethin Rock Bushland Reserve Network
 Dunethin Rock Recreation Area
 Maroochy River Esplanade – River Road
 Mount Ninderry Bushland Conservation Reserve

References

Further reading

External links

Suburbs of the Sunshine Coast Region
Localities in Queensland